The 2013 SAP Open was a men's tennis tournament played on indoor hard courts. It was the 125th and final edition of the SAP Open, and part of the ATP World Tour 250 series of the 2013 ATP World Tour. It took place at the HP Pavilion in San Jose, United States, from February 11 through February 17, 2013. First-seeded Milos Raonic won the singles title.

Finals

Singles 

 Milos Raonic defeated  Tommy Haas, 6–4, 6–3

Doubles 

 Xavier Malisse /  Frank Moser defeated  Lleyton Hewitt /  Marinko Matosevic,  6–0, 6–7(5–7), [10–4]

Singles main-draw entrants

Seeds 

 Rankings are as of February 4, 2013.

Other entrants 
The following players received wildcards into the singles main draw:
  Steve Johnson
  Bradley Klahn
  Jack Sock

The following players received entry from the qualifying draw:
  Rik de Voest
  Tim Smyczek
  Ryan Sweeting
  Donald Young

Withdrawals
Before the tournament
 Kevin Anderson (elbow injury)
 Brian Baker (knee injury)
 Alexandr Dolgopolov (ankle injury)
 Mardy Fish (heart problem)
 Feliciano López (wrist injury)

Doubles main-draw entrants

Seeds 

 Rankings are as of February 4, 2013.

Other entrants 
The following pairs received wildcards into the doubles main draw:
  Lleyton Hewitt /  Marinko Matosevic
  Steve Johnson /  Jack Sock
The following pair received entry as alternate:
  Matthew Ebden /  Michael Russell

Withdrawals 
Before the tournament
  Sam Querrey (personal reasons)

References

External links 
Official website

 
SAP Open
SAP Open
SAP Open
SAP Open
SAP Open